Jessamyn Laurel Duke (born June 24, 1986) is an American professional wrestler and former mixed martial artist. As a wrestler, she worked with WWE as part of their NXT brand. She formerly competed for Ultimate Fighting Championship (UFC) and Invicta Fighting Championships in the women's bantamweight division.

Mixed martial arts career

Early career 
Duke started her amateur career in 2010. She fought mainly for Absolute Action MMA and Tuff-N-Uff. She obtained the amateur featherweight title in both organizations.

In 2012, Duke moved to professional mixed martial arts and signed with Invicta FC.

Invicta Fighting Championships 
Duke made her professional and promotional debut against Suzie Montero on July 28, 2012, at Invicta FC 2. She won via TKO in the third round.

Duke faced Marciea Allen on October 6, 2012, at Invicta FC 3. She won via submission due to an armbar in the first round. This victory earned her a submission of the night bonus award, which was split between Duke and Stephanie Frausto, due to her submission victory over Amy Davis in the same event.

Duke faced Miriam Nakamoto on April 5, 2013, at Invicta FC 5. The result was originally a KO victory for Nakamoto but was later overturned by the Missouri Office of Athletics to no contest due to an illegal knee.

The Ultimate Fighter 
In August 2013, Duke was announced as a cast member of The Ultimate Fighter: Team Rousey vs. Team Tate. She defeated Laura Howarth via submission due to a triangle choke during the entry round and was the second female pick of Team Rousey.

Duke faced Raquel Pennington in the elimination round. Pennington defeated Duke via unanimous decision (29–28, 29–28, 29–28) and the performance earned both participants Fight of The Season honors.

Ultimate Fighting Championship 
Duke made her promotional debut against TUF 18 teammate Peggy Morgan on November 30, 2013, at The Ultimate Fighter 18 Finale. She won via unanimous decision (30–27, 30–27, 30–27).

In her second UFC fight, Duke faced Bethe Correia at UFC 172. She lost the fight via unanimous decision (30–27, 29–28, 30–27).

Duke faced Leslie Smith at UFC Fight Night: Cowboy vs. Miller on July 16, 2014. She lost the fight via TKO early in the first round after taking several punches to the face and body.

Duke faced Elizabeth Phillips at UFC on Fox: Dillashaw vs. Barão 2 on July 25, 2015, in a rematch of their amateur bout at RFA 2 – Yvel vs. Alexander. Duke lost the fight via unanimous decision and was subsequently released from the promotion.

Return to Invicta FC
Following her third straight loss in the UFC, Duke re-signed with Invicta and faced Irene Aldana at Invicta FC 16 on March 11, 2016. She lost the fight by a first-round technical knockout.

Duke faced Cindy Dandois at Invicta FC 18 on July 29, 2016. She lost the fight by a first-round submission.

Professional wrestling career

WWE (2018–2021) 
Duke started her professional wrestling training at Santino Bros. Pro Wrestling School in California. On May 7, 2018, WWE announced that Duke, along with Marina Shafir, had signed with WWE and reported to the Performance Center for training.

On October 28 at WWE Evolution, Duke and Shafir made their WWE debuts as heels when they interfered during the NXT Women's Championship match, in which they helped Shayna Baszler win the title over Kairi Sane. Duke and Shafir then aligned themselves with Baszler establishing themselves as heels in the process. They made another appearance at NXT TakeOver: WarGames when they interfered during Baszler and Sane's two out of three falls match, in which Baszler scored the first fall and the victory in the latter to retain the title. On the December 19, 2018, episode of NXT Shafir and Duke made their NXT in-ring debut and lost to Io Shirai and Dakota Kai when Io pinned Shafir after a Moonsault. At NXT TakeOver: Phoenix, Duke and Shafir assisted Baszler in retaining the title against Bianca Belair. On October 23, 2019, Duke and Shafir faced Tegan Nox and Dakota Kai in a number one contender's match for the Women's Tag Team Championship, but were defeated.

After several months of inactivity, Duke returned to WWE television on August 17, 2020, reuniting with Baszler and Shafir, after Nia Jax attacked Shafir and Duke. On the August 31 episode of Raw, Duke made her debut on Raw Underground, an underground fight club hosted by Shane McMahon, where she easily defeated local competitor Avery Taylor. This turned out to be her final WWE appearance. Duke worked as a full time digital content creator for WWE and UpUpDownDown brand. On May 19, 2021, WWE announced that Duke was released from her WWE contract.

Personal life 
Duke is a self-described gamer. In an interview, Ronda Rousey claimed that Duke "pays more of her bills streaming than she does from fighting".

Championships and accomplishments

Mixed martial arts 
 Ultimate Fighting Championship
 The Ultimate Fighter 18 Fight of the Season 
 Invicta Fighting Championships
 Submission of the night (one time) 
 Absolute Action MMA
 AAMMA amateur featherweight title (one time)
 One successful title defense
 Tuff-N-Uff
 Tuff-N-Uff amateur featherweight title (one time)

Muay Thai 
 World Muay Thai Association
 WMA welterweight (152 lb) title

Professional wrestling 
 Pro Wrestling Illustrated
 Ranked No. 69 of the top 100 female wrestlers in the PWI Women's 100 in 2019

Mixed martial arts record 

|-
|Loss
|align=center|3–5 (1)
|Cindy Dandois
|Submission (armbar)
|Invicta FC 18
|
|align=center|1
|align=center|1:33
|Kansas City, Missouri, United States
|
|-
|Loss
|align=center|3–4 (1)
|Irene Aldana
|TKO (punches)
|Invicta FC 16
|
|align=center|1
|align=center|3:08
|Las Vegas, Nevada, United States
|
|-
|Loss
|align=center|3–3 (1)
|Elizabeth Phillips
|Decision (unanimous)
|UFC on Fox: Dillashaw vs. Barão 2
|
|align=center|3
|align=center|5:00
|Chicago, Illinois, United States
|
|-
|Loss
|align=center|3–2 (1)
|Leslie Smith
|TKO (punches)
|UFC Fight Night: Cowboy vs. Miller
|
|align=center|1
|align=center|2:24
|Atlantic City, New Jersey, United States
|
|-
|Loss
|align=center|3–1 (1)
|Bethe Correia
|Decision (unanimous)
|UFC 172
|
|align=center| 3
|align=center| 5:00
|Baltimore, Maryland, United States
|
|-
|Win
|align=center|3–0 (1)
|Peggy Morgan
|Decision (unanimous)
|The Ultimate Fighter 18 Finale
|
|align=center|3
|align=center|5:00
|Las Vegas, Nevada, United States
|
|-
|NC
|align=center|2–0 (1)
|Miriam Nakamoto
|No Contest (overturned)
|Invicta FC 5
|
|align=center|1
|align=center|2:20
|Kansas City, Missouri, United States
|
|-
|Win
|align=center|2–0
|Marciea Allen
|Submission (armbar)
|Invicta FC 3
|
|align=center|1
|align=center|4:42
|Kansas City, Kansas, United States
|
|-
|Win
|align=center|1–0
|Suzie Montero
|TKO (elbows and punches)
|Invicta FC 2
|
|align=center|3
|align=center|2:32
|Kansas City, Kansas, United States
|

|-
|Loss
|align=center|1–1
|Raquel Pennington
|Decision (unanimous)
|rowspan=2|The Ultimate Fighter: Team Rousey vs. Team Tate
| (air date)
|align=center|3
|align=center|5:00
|rowspan=2|Las Vegas, Nevada, United States
|
|-
|Win
|align=center|1–0
| Laura Howarth
|Submission (triangle choke)
| (air date)
|align=center|1
|align=center|3:50
|

|-
|Win
|align=center|5–2
|Elizabeth Phillips
|Submission (guillotine choke)
|RFA 2 – Yvel vs. Alexander
|
|align=center|2
|align=center|0:58
|Kearney, Nebraska, United States
|
|-
|Loss
|align=center|4–2
|Amanda Bell
|TKO (punches)
|Absolute Action MMA 20: Battle Against Breast Cancer 2
|
|align=center|3
|align=center|2:35
|Florence, Kentucky, United States
|
|-
|Win
|align=center|4–1
|Autumn Richardson
|Decision (unanimous)
|Tuff-N-Uff: Future Stars of MMA
|
|align=center|3
|align=center|3:00
|Las Vegas, Nevada, United States
|
|-
|Win
|align=center|3–1
|Crystal Bentley
|Submission (rear-naked choke)
|Absolute Action MMA 13
|
|align=center|2
|align=center|1:29
|Florence, Kentucky, United States
|
|-
|Win
|align=center|2–1
|Sarah Cook
|Submission (rear-naked choke)
|Absolute Action MMA 12: The Anniversary Show
|
|align=center|1
|align=center|0:52
|Florence, Kentucky, United States
|
|-
|Loss
|align=center|1–1
|Ashlee Evans-Smith
|Decision (unanimous)
|Tuff-N-Uff: Las Vegas vs. 10th Planet Riverside
|
|align=center|3
|align=center|2:00
|Las Vegas, Nevada, United States
|
|-
|Win
|align=center|1–0
|Alexandria Stobbe
|TKO (punches)
|Absolute Action MMA 5: Battle Against Breast Cancer
|
|align=center|1
|align=center|1:42
|Florence, Kentucky, United States
|

See also 
 List of female mixed martial artists

References

External links 

 
 
 
 
 
 

1986 births
American female mixed martial artists
American female professional wrestlers
American Muay Thai practitioners
American practitioners of Brazilian jiu-jitsu
Bantamweight mixed martial artists
Mixed martial artists utilizing Muay Thai
Mixed martial artists utilizing Brazilian jiu-jitsu
Female Brazilian jiu-jitsu practitioners
Female Muay Thai practitioners
Living people
Mixed martial artists from Kentucky
People from Whitesburg, Kentucky
Sportswomen from Kentucky
Ultimate Fighting Championship female fighters
21st-century American women
21st-century professional wrestlers